Route 99 is a  north–south state highway in metropolitan Boston, leading from the Boston neighborhood of Charlestown through the northern suburbs of Everett, Malden, and Melrose, and terminating in Saugus at U.S. Route 1 (US 1).

Route description
Route 99 begins where North Washington Street becomes New Rutherford Avenue on the north side of the Charlestown Bridge.  This occurs at the intersection with Chelsea Street, situated above the northbound tunnel of U.S. Route 1.  Route 99 travels as a limited access highway through Charlestown along New Rutherford Avenue, intersecting with ramps for U.S. Route 1 and passing under the Gilmore Bridge that connects Charlestown to Cambridge.  New Rutherford Avenue becomes Rutherford Avenue and the route continues along it, until the route splits off into an underpass below Sullivan Square, where it turns northeastward.  The route emerges to join Alford Street and crosses the Alford Street Bridge over the Mystic River.  After passing through a small strip of Charlestown on the east banks of the river, the route enters Everett, loses its expressway features and limited-access status, and becomes Broadway.

From Everett, the route crosses through Sweetser Circle (the intersection with Route 16 and Revere Beach Parkway) and continues northeastward into the city of Malden, where it intersects Route 60.  The route continues on through a short corner of Melrose before entering Saugus.  Once in Saugus the route terminates at ramps leading to U.S. Route 1.

History
Prior to 1971, the portion north of the interchange with the Revere Beach Parkway (current Route 16, previously US Route 1 & MA Route 1A) was originally part of U.S. Route 1. The stretch south of the interchange to the Charlestown Bridge originally had no known route number assigned to it.  When it became designated as Route 99 circa 1971, its southern terminus was on the Charlestown Bridge, but this was moved to its present location following the Big Dig.

Sweetser Circle has been the site of numerous major accidents, including a gas tanker rollover early on December 5, 2007 that resulted in  spilling, igniting and destroying 21 vehicles and two large multi-family homes.

Major intersections

References

External links

  - Photos related to renovation of Route 99 in Charlestown

099
Malden, Massachusetts
Melrose, Massachusetts